Dave or David Watt may refer to:
Davey Watt (born 1978), Australian motorcycle speedway rider
David Watt (computer scientist) (born 1946), British computer scientist
David Watt (judge), Canadian lawyer, judge, author, and professor
David Watt (Australian cricketer) (1916-2015), Australian cricketer
David Watt (New Zealand cricketer) (1920-1996), New Zealand cricketer and periodontist
Davie Watt (1885-1917), Scottish golfer

See also
David Watts (disambiguation)